Lake Henry is a lake in the municipal district of St. Mary's, in Nova Scotia, Canada.

See also
List of lakes in Nova Scotia

References
 National Resources Canada

Henry